The Shire of Noosa is a local government area about  north of Brisbane in the Sunshine Coast district of South East Queensland, Australia. It existed as a local government entity from 1910 until 2008, when it was amalgamated with the Shire of Maroochy and City of Caloundra to form the Sunshine Coast Region. The shire was re-established on 1 January 2014.

History

Geological history
The Noosa Hinterland was formed during the Oligocene era around 25-30 million years ago when volcanic activity created the ranges. By the beginning of the Neolithic era, Noosa's coast experienced a change in sea level rises when its beaches and waterways began to take shape.

Ancient history
The Noosa area was originally home to several Aboriginal groups. They primarily include the Undumbi tribe to the south, the Dulingbara to the north, and the Kabi Kabi (or Gabbi Gabbi) to the west.

Gubbi Gubbi (Kabi Kabi, Cabbee, Carbi, Gabi Gabi) is an Australian Aboriginal language spoken on Gubbi Gubbi country. The Gubbi Gubbi language region includes the landscape within the local government boundaries of the Sunshine Coast Region and Gympie Region, particularly the towns of Caloundra, Noosa Heads, Gympie and extending north towards Maryborough and south to Caboolture.

In 2003, the Federal Court of Australia determined (title claim QC2013/003) that the native title holders for the Noosa area are the Kabi Kabi First Nation.

Although much of the culture and presence of the traditional owners of the Noosa district has been lost during the short period of white settlement, there still exist many subtle reminders. They include:
 bora rings, used during rituals.
 canoe trees, marks on trees where bark was removed for canoes.
 border/navigation trees, marks on trees used to mark paths and/or tribal borders.
 stone carvings
 burial trees
 middens, shell mound created by thousands of years of discarded shells.
 stone axes
 spoken legends, many local legends which were traditionally passed through the generations survive today.
 place names, many local names are versions of the original Aboriginal names.

It is widely accepted that the name Noosa comes from the local Aboriginal word "Noothera" or "Gnuthuru", in the Kabi Kabi language, for shadow or shady place. However this is unlikely as a 1870 map of Noosa shows the Noosa River written as Nusa River  and a notice to mariners published 1873 refers to Nusa Head and the Nusa River in Laguna Bay.   Nusa is the Indonesian word for island. The Noosa River contains  Makepeace Island, Sheep Island and Goat Island. Laguna Bay was previously known as Nusa Bay and Lagoona Bay. 

A Keeping Place of indigenous cultural and sacred objects is maintained at the Noosa Shire Museum, Pomona.

Early European settlement
Although reports of the area can be traced back to Captain Cook's voyages in May 1770, European settlement in the region did not proceed until almost a century later. The difficulty of transport in the region, which persisted to the 1920s and beyond, was one major reason for that. European settlement was initially driven by timber logging, and then by a gold rush in the Gympie area, north of Noosa. 

In 1871, the Government laid out a port at Tewantin. The surrounding land was duly surveyed and, by 1877, contained two hotels, a boarding house, school, police station and telegraph office. In 1872, the Noosa Heads and coastal region south to Peregian Beach was set aside as an Aboriginal Mission, but that was cancelled in 1878, and land was opened for selection on 15 January 1879. With the construction of the North Coast Railway inland from Tewantin, the port declined in importance after 1890.

Noosa is a region, not a town. It contains beaches and a beach national park, the cleanest river in South-East Queensland and an extensive trail network inland, linking a number of lifestyle villages, including Cooroy and Pomona. In the last 50 years, Noosa has been transformed from an isolated fishing village to a tourist destination. Although that has had its costs, the shire is known for its generally greener approach to development. Most development in Noosa has been restrained. There are no high-rise buildings, due both to local community pressure and to council planning action, and much remaining native forest. 34.8% of the Noosa district consists of National Parks, Conservation Parks, State Forests, and other generally protected land, including parts of the biosphere reserve.

One of the reasons for the popularity of Noosa Heads is that it is one of the few north-facing beaches on Australia's east coast, hence Noosa Beach is relatively protected from the prevailing on-shore wind and from storms.

Council history
The area was originally incorporated on 11 November 1879, under the Divisional Boards Act 1879, as part of the Widgee Divisional Board. Noosa was created as a separate shire in 1910, under the Local Authorities Act 1902, with an initial population of 2,000. The first elections were held on 22 April 1910 and resulted in James Duke becoming the first shire chairman. The Noosa Shire Hall was constructed in Pomona in 1911.

On 8 September 1917, an Honour Roll was unveiled at the Noosa Shire Hall in Pomona, to commemorate those from the district who had left Australia to serve in the armed forces during World War I.

In the early 1970s, with Queensland Government backing, development commenced in the area around Noosa Sound. In December 1980, the shire headquarters moved to Pelican Street, Tewantin. The former shire hall in Pomona became the Noosa Museum, operated by the Cooroora Historical Society.

In 1995, mayor Noel Playford controversially announced a "population cap" of 56,500 people for Noosa Shire, based on the initial concepts developed during the 1982-1985 Council term. The population cap was the expected population under the planning scheme if all available land was developed in accordance with it. Noosa council had performed the calculation for all land in the shire and provided the results in strategic planning documents. Noosa was the first council in Australia to do so.

On 15 March 2008, under the Local Government (Reform Implementation) Act 2007, passed by the Parliament of Queensland in August 2007, the Shire of Noosa was merged with the Shire of Maroochy and the City of Caloundra to form the Sunshine Coast Region. Noosa's mayor, Bob Abbot, won the mayoralty of the new council over Maroochy's Joe Natoli, with 70% of the combined vote. The amalgamation occurred despite a 2007 referendum in Noosa Shire, conducted by the Australian Electoral Commission, in which 95% of voters rejected amalgamation.

In 2012, following a change of state government, a proposal was made to de-amalgamate the Shire of Noosa from the Sunshine Coast Region. On 9 March 2013, 81% of Noosa residents voted to de-amalgamate Noosa from the Sunshine Coast Region. On 18 March 2013, the Sunshine Coast Regional Council decided its new planning scheme should not apply to those areas that were part of the former Noosa Shire (different attitudes to planning and developments having been a major objection by residents of Noosa Shire to the amalgamation).

The Shire of Noosa was re-established on 1 January 2014, and the new councillors and mayor were sworn in the next day. In attendance were Warren Truss, Deputy Prime Minister of Australia and member for Wide Bay, as well as David Gibson, Member for Gympie. The ceremony was followed by the first meeting of the council, held at the Cooroy Memorial Hall, Cooroy.

Structure
The elected council consists of a mayor and six councillors. Noosa Shire does not have divisional electoral boundaries.

Current council members

Towns and localities
The Shire of Noosa includes the following settlements:

Greater Noosa:
 Castaways Beach
 Noosa Heads
 Noosaville
 Sunrise Beach
 Sunshine Beach
 Tewantin
Coastal Region:
 Como1
 Marcus Beach
 Noosa National Park
 Noosa North Shore
 Peregian Beach2
 Teewah

Hinterland:
 Black Mountain
 Boreen
 Boreen Point
 Cooran
 Cooroibah
 Cooroy
 Cooroy Mountain
 Cootharaba
 Doonan2
 Eerwah Vale2
 Federal
 Kin Kin
 Lake Macdonald
 Pinbarren
 Pomona
 Ridgewood
 Ringtail Creek
 Tinbeerwah

1 - includes part of Great Sandy National Park
2 - shared with Sunshine Coast Region

Population

Chairmen and mayors of Noosa ShireElected by fellow councillors:
 James Duke (1910–1911)
 Frank Conroy (1911–1914)
 Eugene von Blankensee (1914–1915)
 Alexander Chapman (1915–1916)
 Charles Livingstone (1916–1917)
 Alexander Parker (1917–1918)
 Alexander Chapman (1918–1919)
 Charles Crank (1919–1920)
 Alexander Parker (1920–1921)Directly elected:
 William Ferguson (1921–1927)
 Frederick Bryan (1927–1930)
 Charles Crank (1930–1939)
 William Ferguson (1939–1946)
 Robert McAnally (1946–1955)
 Victor Gee (1955–1958)
 S.T. (Stanley) Adams (1958–1964)
 Ian MacDonald (1964–1980)
 Bert Wansley  (1980–1988)
 Noel Playford  (1988–1997)
 Bob Abbot (1997–2008)
 For mayor during amalgamation (2008–2013) see: Sunshine Coast Region''
 Noel Playford  (2014–2016)
 Tony Wellington (2016–2020)
 Clare Stewart (2020–present)

Culture
The Noosa Film Festival was held in Noosa between 2 and 8 September in 1999. A number of other festivals are also held in Noosa, including the Noosa Festival of Surfing.

Noosa Arts Theatre is a flourishing and widely reputed centre for performing arts in the area. As well as various other food and cultural festivals, each year Noosa boasts the Noosa Long Weekend Festival, a 10-day (and night) multi-arts genre cultural festival. Theatre, dance, music, food, film, supper clubs, workshops and more are featured as part of the program of free and ticketed events. The festival attracts over 10,000 people each year.

The recently developed J Centre in Noosa Heads has become another venue for live theatre and musical performances, as well as a secondary campus for the University of the Sunshine Coast.

The Noosa Country Show, established 1909, is a yearly event to showcase the shire's best cattle, horsemen etc. The show is held at the Pomona Showgrounds on the second weekend of every September.

The King of the Mountain is an annual festival and mountain challenge held in Pomona in the third week of July.

Pomona is also home to the Noosa Shire Museum, where European and indigenous history is displayed side by side, and The Majestic Theatre, a performing arts centre for the Noosa Northern Hinterland. An art gallery has been established in the old Pomona Railway Station.

Services
The Shire of Noosa operates libraries in Noosaville and Cooroy. A mobile library service visits the following districts on a weekly schedule: Noosa Heads, Sunrise Beach, Cooran, Federal, Kin Kin, Boreen Point, Peregian Beach and Pomona.

See also 
 Noosa Biosphere Reserve
 Noosa National Park
 Noosa Festival of Surfing
 Noosa Triathlon

References

Further reading

External links
Noosa Shire Council Home.
Noosa News  - Latest news, local stories and sport from Noosa, on the Sunshine Coast, Queensland
Official Tourism Noosa Website  - News, history, accommodation, activities, events & visitor information
 Noosa Arts Theatre Official Website
  Noosa Longweekend Annual Event Official Website
 National Library of Australia Trove Archive o

 
Sunshine Coast, Queensland
Local government areas of Queensland
1910 establishments in Australia
2008 disestablishments in Australia
Populated places disestablished in 2008
2014 establishments in Australia
Former local government areas of Queensland